Syrstad may refer to:

Syrstad Rock, a rock outcrop on Mount Bursey, Marie Byrd Land, West Antarctica

People with the surname
Johan Syrstad (born 1924), Norwegian politician
Kåre Syrstad (1939–2013), Norwegian agrarian leader

See also
 John Systad (1912–1998), Norwegian long-distance runner